Neaneflus is a genus of beetles in the family Cerambycidae, containing the following species:

 Neaneflus brevispinus Chemsak, 1962
 Neaneflus fuchsii (Wickham, 1905)

References

Elaphidiini